Amir Cheraghali (also Romanized as Amīr Cherāgh‘alī; also known as Cherāgh ‘Alī) is a village in Howmeh-ye Sharqi Rural District, in the Central District of Ramhormoz County, Khuzestan Province, Iran. At the 2006 census, its population was 439, in 84 families.

References 

Populated places in Ramhormoz County